Sándor Szokolay (30 March 1931 – 8 December 2013) was a Hungarian composer and professor of the Liszt Ferenc Academy, Budapest.

Life
Szokolay was born in Kunágota in a Lutheran evangelic family and began his music studies in Békéstarhos. Then he attended the Franz Liszt Academy of Music, Budapest. His teachers were Ferenc Szabó and Ferenc Farkas. Between 1957 and 1961 he worked at the Hungarian Radio music department. Between 1959 and 1994 he was a professor at the Franz Liszt Academy of Music, Budapest. He retired in 1994 and moved to Sopron where he lived and worked till his death. His main works, operas, oratoria, are well known all over the world.

Szokolay was chairman of the Hungarian Kodály Society (1978) and the Hungarian Music Camera (1991–92), and he was member of the Hungarian Széchenyi Art Academy (1992).

Prizes
Wieniawsky-competition, winner (Warsaw, 1956)
Erkel Ferenc-prize (1960, 1965)
Kossuth-prize (1966)
Merited Artist (1976)
Bartók-Pásztory prize (1987)
Hungarian Art prize (1993)
Corvin-chain (2001)

Discography
5 author disc
Author Disc CD in 1997

References

Sources

External links

 Evangelic Church life
 Fidelio

1931 births
2013 deaths
Franz Liszt Academy of Music alumni
Academic staff of the Franz Liszt Academy of Music
Hungarian classical composers
Hungarian male classical composers
Hungarian opera composers
Male opera composers
People from Békés County